Emmy Gunilla "Emy" Machnow (1 September 1897 – 23 November 1974) was a Swedish freestyle swimmer. She won a bronze medal in 4 × 100 m freestyle relay at the 1920 Summer Olympics in Antwerp along with Aina Berg, Carin Nilsson and Jane Gylling.

References

1897 births
1974 deaths
Olympic swimmers of Sweden
Swimmers at the 1920 Summer Olympics
Olympic bronze medalists for Sweden
Swimmers from Stockholm
Olympic bronze medalists in swimming
Swedish female freestyle swimmers
Medalists at the 1920 Summer Olympics